Quintus Egnatius Gallienus Perpetuus (c. 210 - after 250) was a Roman politician.

He was the son of Quintus Egnatius Proculus and wife Maria Aureliana Violentilla.

He was consularis vir in Allifae, Samnium, Italy.

References
 Christian Settipani. Continuité gentilice et continuité sénatoriale dans les familles sénatoriales romaines à l'époque impériale, 2000

3rd-century Romans
Gallienus Perpetuus, Quintus